Gilday is a surname. Notable people with the surname include:

John Gilday (1874–1937), Australian politician
Leela Gilday, Canadian musician
Michael Gilday (speed skater) (born 1987), Canadian short track speed skater
Michael M. Gilday, United States Navy admiral
Patrick Gilday (1862–1917), American labor leader
Gary Gilday, European Artist

See also
 Gildea
 Kildee